Electoral district of Coburg was an electoral district of the Legislative Assembly in the Australian state of Victoria.

Members for Coburg

Election results

References

Former electoral districts of Victoria (Australia)
1927 establishments in Australia
2002 disestablishments in Australia